The 2014–15 LSU Tigers basketball team represented Louisiana State University during the 2014–15 NCAA Division I men's basketball season. The team's head coach was Johnny Jones, who was in his third season at LSU.  They played their home games at Pete Maravich Assembly Center as members of the Southeastern Conference. They finished the season 22–11, 11–7 in SEC play to finish in a four-way tie for third place. They lost in the quarterfinals of the SEC tournament to Auburn. They received an at-large bid to the NCAA tournament where they lost in the second round to NC State.

Previous season and offseason
LSU completed the 2013–14 season with an overall record of 20–14 and a 9–9 record in Southeastern Conference play.  After receiving a bye for the first round of the SEC tournament, the Tigers defeated the Alabama Crimson Tide in the second round.  They were eliminated by the Kentucky Wildcats in the quarterfinals. They were invited to the National Invitation Tournament where they defeated San Francisco in the first round. They were eliminated by SMU in the second round.

The Tigers lost several key players following the end of the season.  Andre Stringer, the team's leading three-point shooter, completed his senior season.  Junior forward Johnny O'Bryant III, the team leader in scoring and rebounding, elected to forgo his senior season and enter the 2014 NBA draft, where he was selected in the second round by the Milwaukee Bucks.  In a somewhat surprising move, LSU chose not to renew the scholarship of point guard Anthony Hickey, who led the team in assists and steals, for the 2014–15 season.  Hickey transferred to Oklahoma State, where he received a waiver from the NCAA to allow him to play immediately.

Keith Hornsby, who transferred to LSU from UNC Asheville and was required to sit out the prior season, will be eligible to play beginning with the 2014–15 season.  The Tigers also signed a strong recruiting class, which included Elbert Robinson, one of the top-rated centers in the country, and Josh Gray, a junior college transfer at guard who led the NJCAA in scoring in 2013-2014 with 34.7 points per game.

Departures

Recruits

Roster

Schedule and results

|-
!colspan=12 style="background:#33297B; color:#FDD023;"| Exhibition

|-
!colspan=12 style="background:#33297B; color:#FDD023;"| Non-conference regular season

|-
!colspan=12 style="background:#33297B; color:#FDD023;"| SEC regular season

|-
!colspan=12 style="background:#33297B;"| SEC Tournament

|-
!colspan=12 style="background:#33297B;"| NCAA tournament

Source:

See also
2014–15 LSU Lady Tigers basketball team

References

LSU Tigers basketball seasons
Lsu
Lsu
LSU
LSU